Mahkota Parade is a shopping mall located in Banda Hilir, Malacca City, Malacca, Malaysia, which was originally established on 30 January 1994 and relaunched on 1 May 2010 after refurbishment. It was acquired by Hektar REIT (Real Estate Investment Trust) in 2006 and became one of its shopping centres, alongside Kulim Central and Central Square in Kedah, Wetex Parade and Segamat Central in Johor, and Subang Parade in Selangor.

It has more than 1,000 parking spaces. It houses stores of international brands, food-and-beverages outlets, entertainment centers, 10 Screen MM cineplexes, Ampang Super Bowl, karaoke etc.

See also
 Dataran Pahlawan Melaka Megamall
 List of shopping malls in Malaysia

References

External links

 

1994 establishments in Malaysia
Buildings and structures in Malacca City
Shopping malls established in 1994
Shopping malls in Malacca